The Elzer Berg is a hill in Hesse, Germany. The Autobahn A3 crosses the hill. Its downhill slope facing Limburg is known for 
its speed limit that is rigorously enforced with cameras mounted in the sign gantries.

A tunnel of the high speed train track from Cologne to Frankfurt runs under the hill as well.

Hills of Hesse
Mountains and hills of the Westerwald